This is a list of comics creators. Although comics have different formats, this list mainly focuses on comic book and graphic novel creators. However, some creators of comic strips are also found here, as are some of the early innovators of the art form.

The list is sorted by the country of origin of the authors, although they may have published, or now be resident in other countries.

Argentina

Australia

Belgium
(bande dessinée, BD, strip (verhaal))

Brazil

Canada

Chile
 Máximo Carvajal (Dr. Mortis, Black Sloane)
 Alejandro Jodorowsky (Anibal 5, Fabulas pánicas, Los insoportables Brobolla, The Incal, The Technopriests, Metabarons)
 Themo Lobos (Mampato, Cucalón)
 Pepo (Condorito)
 Gabriel Rodriguez (Locke & Key)
 Edmundo Searle
 Vicar (Locutín, Hipólito y Camilo, Quevedo, Paquita, Huaso Ramón)

China
 Benjamin Zhang Bin (Seven Swords, Sky Doll)
 Chao Yat
 Li Chi-Tak (Black Mask)
 Lee Chi Ching (Sun Zi's Tactics, Records of the Three Kingdoms)
 Daxiong
 Fung Chin Pang (Confidential Assassination Troop)
 Feng Zikai (Zikai Manhua, Hu Sheng Hua Ji)
 Khoo Fuk-lung (Saint)
 Steve Gan (Star-Lord, Skull the Slayer)
 Huang Yao (Niubizi)
 Lau Wan-kit (Feel 100%)
 Nicky Lee (Youth Gone Wild, The One)
 Alice Meichi Li
 Yishan Li
 Alice Mak (McMug, McDull)
 Chan Mou (Unhuman, The Ravages of Time)
 Jenny Pat 
 Andy Seto (Cyber Weapon Z)
 Te Wei (The Proud General)
 Tsai Chih Chung (The Drunken Swordsman)
 Ma Wing-shing (Fung Wan, Chinese Hero)
 Alfonso Wong (Old Master Q)
 Wong Yuk-long (Oriental Heroes, Weapons of the Gods)
 Ye Qianyu (Mr. Wang)
 Zhang Leping (Sanmao)
 Zhang Xiaobai (Si loin et si proche)

Colombia
 Oscar Sierra Quintero, aka Oki

Costa Rica
 Félix Arburola Bustos (continued Tricolín) 
 Franco Céspedes (worked on Star Mage) 
 Carlos Enrique Figueroa (Tricolín) 
 Fernando Zeledón Guzmán - (La Semana en Serio) 
 Hugo Díaz Jiménez - (Las Fisgonas de Paso Ancho)
 Dan Mora 
 Francisco Munguía - (Pantys) 
 Iván & Andrés Ramírez Ortiz - (founders of the comics magazines Revista Fotocopia and Ultracomics, creators of Buscongo, Jairo el Soñador, Mente y Máquina) 
 Rodicab - (Desafíos, Leyendas de u Sabanero) 
 Juan Díaz Rodriguez - (Glupy) 
 Carlos Alvarado Salazar - (Carlos Pincel) 
 John Timms - (worked on Harley Quinn) 
 Noé Solano Vargas - (Candelario)

Côte d'Ivoire
 Gilbert G. Groud

Croatia

Cuba

Denmark
(tegneserie, plural form: tegneserier)

El Salvador
 Edmundo Anchietta López

Finland
(sarjakuvat)

France
(bande dessinée, BD)

Achdé - (CRS=Détresse, continued Lucky Luke)
Peggy Adam - (Luchadoras)
Alexis - (Timoléon, Cinémastock, Superdupont, Al Crane, Le Transperceneige)
Diego Aranega - (Focu)
Claude Auclair - (Simon du Fleuve)
Pénélope Bagieu - (My Quite Fascinating Life, Exquisite Corpse, Joséphine)
Vincent Batignole - (Gloomcookie)
Edmond Baudoin - (Couma Acò)
David B. - (L'Ascension du Haut Mal)
Ted Benoit - (continued Blake and Mortimer)
Charles Berberian - (Monsieur Jean)
Philippe Bercovici - (Les Femmes en Blanc)
Georges Bess - (Le Lama Blanc, Anibal Cinq, Juan Solo, Péma Ling)
Enki Bilal - (Nikopol Trilogy)
Blexbolex - (L'Imagier des Gens, Saisons, Romance)
Bruno Blum - (comics about famous rock artists)
François Boucq – (Les Leçons du Professeur Bourremou, Jérôme Moucherot, Face de Lune, Les Aventures de la Mort et de Lao-Tseu, Bouncer)
Claire Bouilhac - (Francis Blaireau Farceur )
François Bourgeon - (Les Passagers du Vent)
Émile Bravo - (Épatantes aventures de Jules)
Claire Bretécher - (Les Frustrés)
Philippe Briones - (Marvel Comics, DC Comics)
Paul and Gaëtan Brizzi - (La Cavale du Dr Destouches)
Jean de Brunhoff - (Babar the elephant)
Cabu  - (Hara-Kiri, Charlie Hebdo)
Caza - (L' Âge d'Ombre)
Florence Cestac - (Harry Mickson, Les Déblok, Cestac Pour Les Grands)
Jean Cézard - (Arthur le fantôme justicier)
Yves Chaland - (The Adventures of Freddy Lombard)
Pierre Christin - (Valérian et Laureline)
Serge Clerc - (Captain Futur, Phil Perfect, Sam Blanc)
Olivier Coipel - (House of M, Legion of Super-Heroes, Thor)
Christophe, AKA Georges Colomb - (La Famille Fenouillard)
Daphné Collignon - (Flora et les Étoiles Filantes)
Colonel Moutarde - (Le Meilleur de Moi, Grenadine et Mentalo, La BD des Filles, Maïa)
Didier Conrad - (Les Innommables, continued Astérix)
François Corteggiani – (worked on Pif le chien, Young Blueberry)
Ludovic Debeurme - (Lucille)
Nicolas de Crécy - (Foligatto, Léon la Came)
Bernadette Després - (Tom-Tom et Nana)
 Alain Dodier - (Gully, Jérôme K. Jérôme Bloche) 
Gustave Doré - (Les Travaux d'Hercule, Trois Artistes Incompris et Mécontents, Histoire Pittoresque de la Sainte Russie)
Philippe Druillet - (Lone Sloane)
Philippe Dupuy - (Monsieur Jean)
Marie Duval - (Ally Sloper)
Édika - (Pom-Pom-Pidou-Waah)
Yacine Elghorri - (Gunman, Bestial, Factory)
Jean-Yves Ferri - (Le Retour à la Terre, continued Astérix)
Floc'h - (Le Dossier Harding Une Trilogie Anglaise, Une Vie de Rêve)
F'Murr (Richard Peyzaret) - (Le Génie des alpages)
Jean-Claude Forest - (Barbarella)
Jean-Claude Fournier - (continued Spirou et Fantasio)
Sylvain Frécon - (comics based on Oggy and the Cockroaches)
Louis Forton - (Les Pieds Nickéles)
Fred (Frédéric Aristidès) - (Philémon)
Gébé - (L'An 01) 
Jean-Pierre Gibrat - (Goudard, Mattéo)
Paul Gillon - (Les naufragés du temps)
Jean Giraud, also known as Gir and Moebius - (Blueberry, Arzach, L'Incal)
Christian Godard - (Martin Milan)
Annie Goetzinger - (Félina, Aurore, La Demoiselle de la Légion d'honneur, Agence Hardy)
René Goscinny - (Astérix, Oumpah-pah, Le Petit Nicolas, Iznogoud)
Marcel Gotlib  - (Gai-Luron, Rubrique-à-Brac, Les Dingodossiers, Hamster Jovial, Superdupont)
Jean Graton - (Michel Vaillant)
Virginie Greiner – (Secrets)
Éric Hérenguel - (Balade au bout du monde, Krän)
Jacques Hiron - (Le Paquebot des Sables)
Richard Isanove - (penciller for The Dark Tower: The Gunslinger Born)
André Juillard - (Bohémond de Saint Gilles, Arno, Les Sept Vies de l'Epervier, Plume Aux Vents)
Yves Ker Ambrun - (HB-Scott, Gaspard le Lézard, Flippo & Punkina, Schnecksnyder)
Kerascoët - (Beauté, Miss Pas Touche)
Patrice Killoffer - (continued Fantômette)
Claude Lacroix (1944–2021) 
Emmanuel Larcenet - (La Vie est Courte, Bill Baoud, Les Cosmonautes du Futur, Le Combat Ordinaire)
Oriane Lassus – Le Meilleurissime Repaire de la Terre, Quoi de plus normal qu'infliger la vie?
Gérard Lauzier - (Michel Choupon)
Étienne Lécroart - (Oupus)
Olivier Ledroit - (Black Moon Chronicles)
Jean Leguay - (Kebra, Keubla, Gazoline)
Serge Lehman - (The Chimera Brigade)
Samantha Leriche-Gionet – (Boumeries)
Georges Lévis (Jean Sidobre, Sylvia) - (Liz et Beth, Les Perles de l'Amour)
Jacques Lob - (Superdupont)
Jean-Marc Lofficier - ('Marvel Comics, DC Comics)
Régis Loisel - (La Quête de l'oiseau du temps)
Jacques de Loustal - (various one-shot comics)
Makyo - (Jérôme K. Jérôme Bloche, La Balade au Bout du Monde)
Nikita Mandryka - (Le Concombre Masqué)
Richard Marazano - (Cuervos)
Frank Margerin - (Lucien, Simone et Léon)
Jul Maroh - (Blue Is The Warmest Color)
Jacques Martin - (The Adventures of Alix, Lefranc)
Jean-Luc Masbou - (De Cape et de Crocs)
Jean-Christophe Menu - (Meder, Plates-bandes)
Metaphrog - (Louis)
Jean-Claude Mézières - (Valérian et Laureline, Ravian)
Jean-François Miniac - (comics based on Agatha Christie)
Marion Montaigne - (Tu Mourras Moins Bête)
Fabrice Neaud - (Journal)
Nicolas Nemiri - (Je Suis Morte, Hyper L'Hyppo)
Aurélie Neyret – (Les Carnets de Cerise)
Vincent Paronnaud - (mostly one-shot comics)
Jean-Louis Pesch - (Sylvain et Sylvette)
René Pétillon - (Jack Palmer, Le Baron Noir)
Georges Pichard - (Ténébrax, Submerman, Blanche Epiphanie)
Émile-Joseph Pinchon - (Bécassine)
Raymond Poïvet - (Les Pionniers de l'Espérance)
Jean-Michel Ponzio - (Genetiks, The Chimpanzee Complex)
 Léo Quievreux – (Immersion trilogy) 
Benjamin Rabier - (Gideon the duck)
 Pascal Regnauld - (continued Inspector Canardo) 
Jean-Marc Reiser - (worked for Hara-Kiri, Charlie Hebdo)
Paul Renaud - (Cavewoman)
Rob-Vel, aka François Robert Velter (Spirou)
Michel Rodrigue - (Doggyguard, continued Clifton and Comanche)
Rosalys - (Workaholic)
Stephane Roux - (worked for Marvel Comics, DC Comics and Semic Comics)
Jacqueline Rivière - (scripted Bécassine)
Alain Saint-Ogan - (Zig et Puce)
Guy Sajer (Dimitri) - (scripted Jean Valhardi, drew Harald le Viking, Goutatou et Dorochaux, Le Goulag)
Mathieu Sapin - (Akissi, Gérard)
Riad Sattouf - (The Arab of the Future)
Jean-Jacques Sempé - (Le Petit Nicolas)
Joann Sfar - (Donjon)
Roxanne Starr - (letterer for various comics)
Philippe Sternis - (Snark Saga, Mouche)
Jean Tabary - (Iznogoud)
Jacques Tardi - (Adèle Blanc-Sec, It Was the War of the Trenches, Nestor Burma)
Didier Tarquin - (Lanfeust of Troy)
Jacques Terpant - (Sept Cavaliers, Les Royaumes de Borée)
Jean Teulé - (Le Magasin des Suicides)
Tibet - (Chick Bill, Ric Hochet)
Annette Tison – (co-creator of Barbapapa)
Roland Topor - (worked for Hara-Kiri)
Ed Tourriol - (Mixman, Urban Rivals)
Lewis Trondheim - (La Mouche, Kaput and Zösky, The spiffy adventures of McConey)
Albert Uderzo - (Astérix, Oumpah-pah, Tanguy et Laverdure)
Vanyda - (L' Immeuble d'en Face (The Building Opposite)
 Laurent Verron - (Le Maltais, Odilon Verjus) 
Martin Veyron - (Bernard Lermite, L'Amour Propre)
Bastien Vivès - (Pour l'empire, Polina)
Alain Voss - (Heilman, Adrénaline, Anarcity, Zensetos)
Claire Wendling - (Les Lumières de l'Amalou)

Germany
(der Comic, plural form: die Comics)

Greece
(το κόμικ/κόμικς, plural form: τα κόμικς)

Hungary
 Nándor Honti, aka Bit - (Nagyapó Mozgószínháza, Tréfás Természetrajz, Séta Álomországban) 
 Zoltan Varga - (Batmanus, Dállász)

Iceland
 Pétur Bjarnason (Drottning Drusilla, later Regina) 
 Helgi Thorgils Fridjónsson 
 Bjarni Hinriksson - (Krassandi Samvera) 
 Ingi Jensson

Iran
Marjane Satrapi (Persepolis)

Ireland

India
{{columns-list|colwidth=18em|
Neelabh Banerjee
Anant Pai
Sarnath Banerjee
Yusuf Lien aka Yusuf Bangalorewala
Samit Basu
Chittaprosad Bhattacharya
Narayan Debnath
Nikhil Chaudhary (environmentalist)
Arjun Gaind
Sanjay Gupta
Jeevan Kang
Naresh Kumar
R. K. Laxman
Pratap Mullick
Gaman Palem
Pran Kumar Sharma (Chacha Chaudhary, Pinki)
Anupam Sinha
Aabid Surti (Bahadur)
Kruttika Susarla
C. M. Vitankar
Ram Waeerkar
Amruta Patil
Vishwajyoti Ghosh
Sumit Kumar
Malik Sajad
Orijit Sen

Indonesia
 Dwi Koendoro - (Panji Koming, Legenda Sawung Kampret) 
 Yohanes Surya - (Archi & Meidy)

Israel
Uri Fink
Dudu Geva
Rutu Modan

Italy
(fumetto, plural form: fumetti)

Japan
(manga)
see List of manga artists

Kenya
see List of Kenyan editorial cartoonists

Lebanon
see List of Lebanese editorial ists

Macedonia
See List of Macedonian comics creators

Malaysia
Billy Tan
Lat - (The Kampung Boy)

Malta
Joe Sacco - (Palestine)

Netherlands
(strip, stripverhaal, plural forms: strips, stripverhalen)

New Zealand

Nigeria
Lemi Ghariokwu
Siku

Norway
(tegneserie, plural form: tegneserier)

Paraguay 
 Robin Wood

Philippines
(komiks)
See List of Filipino comics creators

Poland

Portugal
(BD, Banda Desenhada, Histórias em Quadradinhos)

Romania
(Bandă desenată)

Russia
()

Serbia

Singapore
Foo Swee Chin

Slovenia

South Africa

South Korea

Spain
(cómics, historietas, tebeos)

Sweden
(tecknad serie)

Switzerland

Taiwan
Jo Chen

Thailand

Turkey

United Kingdom

United States
See List of American comics creators

Uruguay
Barreto, Eduardo, DC Comics artist

See also
 Cartoonist
 List of comics creators appearing in comics
 List of Batman creators
 List of cartoonists
 List of Green Lantern creators
 List of Hellblazer creators
 List of Marvel Comics people
 List of minicomics creators
 List of Silver Age comics creators
 List of Superman creators

Sources

"Aart Clerkx." Lambiek.net. N.p., 01 Jan. 1970. Web. 15 May 2019.

"Alain Dodier." Lambiek.net. N.p., 01 Jan. 1970. Web. 14 May 2019.

"Albert Funke Küpper." Lambiek.net. N.p., 01 Jan. 1970. Web. 15 May 2019.

"Antoon Herckenrath." Lambiek.net. N.p., 01 Jan. 1970. Web. 14 May 2019.

"Arnold H. Clerkx." Lambiek.net. N.p., 01 Jan. 1970. Web. 15 May 2019.

"Arturo Lanteri." Lambiek.net. N.p., 01 Jan. 1970. Web. 14 May 2019.

"Brösel." Lambiek.net. N.p., 01 Jan. 1970. Web. 14 May 2019.

"Carry Brugman." Lambiek.net. N.p., 01 Jan. 1970. Web. 15 May 2019.

"Comiclopedia - Illustrated Artist Compendium." Lambiek.net. N.p., n.d. Web. 14 May 2019.

"Dik Bruynesteyn." Lambiek.net. N.p., 01 Jan. 1970. Web. 15 May 2019.

"Dr. Heinrich Hoffmann." Lambiek.net. N.p., 01 Jan. 1970. Web. 15 May 2019.

"E. O. Plauen." Lambiek.net. N.p., n.d. Web. 15 May 2019.

"Evert Geradts." Lambiek.net. N.p., 01 Jan. 1970. Web. 15 May 2019.

"Flip Fermin." Lambiek.net. N.p., 01 Jan. 1970. Web. 15 May 2019.

"Floor De Goede." Lambiek.net. N.p., 01 Jan. 1970. Web. 15 May 2019.

"Frans Funke Küpper." Lambiek.net. N.p., 01 Jan. 1970. Web. 15 May 2019.

"Frederik Bramming." Lambiek.net. N.p., 01 Jan. 1970. Web. 14 May 2019.

"Frits Godhelp." Lambiek.net. N.p., 01 Jan. 1970. Web. 15 May 2019.

"GoT." Lambiek.net. N.p., 01 Jan. 1970. Web. 14 May 2019.

"Guido Van Driel." Lambiek.net. N.p., 01 Jan. 1970. Web. 15 May 2019.

"Harry Buckinx." Lambiek.net. N.p., 01 Jan. 1970. Web. 15 May 2019.

"Henk Backer." Lambiek.net. N.p., 01 Jan. 1970. Web. 15 May 2019.

"Jacques Laudy." Lambiek.net. N.p., 01 Jan. 1970. Web. 14 May 2019.

"Jacques Van Melkebeke." Lambiek.net. N.p., 01 Jan. 1970. Web. 14 May 2019.

"Jamiri." Lambiek.net. N.p., n.d. Web. 15 May 2019.

"Jan Dirk Van Exter." Lambiek.net. N.p., 01 Jan. 1970. Web. 15 May 2019.

"Jan Feith." Lambiek.net. N.p., 01 Jan. 1970. Web. 15 May 2019.

"Joop Geesink." Lambiek.net. N.p., 01 Jan. 1970. Web. 15 May 2019.

"Kamagurka." Lambiek.net. N.p., 01 Jan. 1970. Web. 14 May 2019.

Knudde, Kjell. "David Bueno De Mesquita." Lambiek.net. N.p., 01 Jan. 1970. Web. 15 May 2019.

Knudde, Kjell. "Eppo Doeve." Lambiek.net. N.p., 01 Jan. 1970. Web. 15 May 2019.

Knudde, Kjell. "Herman Brood." Lambiek.net. N.p., 01 Jan. 1970. Web. 15 May 2019.

Knudde, Kjell. "Klaus Voormann." Lambiek.net. N.p., 01 Jan. 1970. Web. 15 May 2019.

Knudde, Kjell. "Remco Campert." Lambiek.net. N.p., 01 Jan. 1970. Web. 15 May 2019.

"Maarten Gerritsen." Lambiek.net. N.p., 01 Jan. 1970. Web. 15 May 2019.

MAGNERON, Philippe. "Bedetheque - BD, Manga, Comics." BDGest RSS. N.p., n.d. Web. 14 May 2019.

"Margreet De Heer." Lambiek.net. N.p., 01 Jan. 1970. Web. 15 May 2019.

"Michel Weyland." Lambiek.net. N.p., 01 Jan. 1970. Web. 14 May 2019.

"Nestor Gonzalez Fossat." Lambiek.net. N.p., 01 Jan. 1970. Web. 14 May 2019.

"Picha." Lambiek.net. N.p., 01 Jan. 1970. Web. 14 May 2019.

"Piet Broos." Stripwinkel Lambiek. N.p., n.d. Web. 15 May 2019.

"Primaggio Mantovi." Lambiek.net. N.p., 01 Jan. 1970. Web. 14 May 2019.

"Ralf König." Lambiek.net. N.p., 01 Jan. 1970. Web. 15 May 2019.

"Raoul Servais." Lambiek.net. N.p., 01 Jan. 1970. Web. 14 May 2019.

"Ray Goossens." Lambiek.net. N.p., 01 Jan. 1970. Web. 14 May 2019.

"Raymond Bär Van Hemmersweil." Lambiek.net. N.p., 01 Jan. 1970. Web. 15 May 2019.

Schuddeboom, Bas, and Kjell Knudde. "Johnn Bakker." Lambiek.net. N.p., 01 Jan. 1970. Web. 15 May 2019.

Schuddeboom, Bas. "Andries Brandt." Lambiek.net. N.p., 01 Jan. 1970. Web. 15 May 2019.

Schuddeboom, Bas. "Ben Abas." Lambiek.net. N.p., 01 Jan. 1970. Web. 15 May 2019.

Schuddeboom, Bas. "Bert Bus." Lambiek.net. N.p., 01 Jan. 1970. Web. 15 May 2019.

Schuddeboom, Bas. "Jos Beekman." Lambiek.net. N.p., 01 Jan. 1970. Web. 15 May 2019.

Schuddeboom, Bas. "René Bergmans." Lambiek.net. N.p., 01 Jan. 1970. Web. 15 May 2019.

Schuddeboom, Bas. "Robbert Damen." Lambiek.net. N.p., 01 Jan. 1970. Web. 15 May 2019.

Schuddeboom, Bas. "Rolf Kauka." Lambiek.net. N.p., 01 Jan. 1970. Web. 15 May 2019.

Schuddeboom, Bas. "Ruben L. Oppenheimer." Lambiek.net. N.p., 01 Jan. 1970. Web. 15 May 2019.

Schuddeboom, Bas. "Wilma Van Den Bosch." Lambiek.net. N.p., 01 Jan. 1970. Web. 15 May 2019.

"Theo Funke Küpper." Lambiek.net. N.p., 01 Jan. 1970. Web. 15 May 2019.

"Ton Beek." Lambiek.net. N.p., 01 Jan. 1970. Web. 15 May 2019.

"Uco Egmond." Lambiek.net. N.p., 01 Jan. 1970. Web. 15 May 2019.

"Walter Moers." Lambiek.net. N.p., 01 Jan. 1970. Web. 15 May 2019.

"Wilhelm Busch." Lambiek.net. N.p., 01 Jan. 1970. Web. 14 May 2019.

External links
Lambiek Comiclopedia (biographical articles)
Bédéthèque - database of French language

 
Lists of people by occupation